Route 305 is a Connecticut state highway in the northern Hartford suburbs, running from Bloomfield to Windsor.

Route description
Route 305 begins at an intersection with Route 187 in northeastern Bloomfield and heads generally east towards the town of Windsor. It crosses the town line about a mile later and heads generally southeast. Route 305 continues east for another mile until it ends at an intersection with Route 75 in the town center of Windsor. Route 305 is known as Old Windsor Road in Bloomfield and as Bloomfield Avenue in Windsor.

History
Prior to 1963, part of the route, from the Bloomfield line to Route 75, was an unsigned but state-maintained road known as SR 905 (which became a state road in 1959). Initially, the state had planned to turn over SR 905 to Windsor but when the final decisions for the 1962 Route Reclassification Act were announced, it was instead retained in the state highway system, with the continuation in Bloomfield also taken over by the state. At the beginning of 1963, SR 905 was renumbered as Route 305, officially becoming a signed route. Route 305 has had no significant changes since.

Junction list

References

External links

305
Transportation in Hartford County, Connecticut